"Boogie Woogie Blue Plate" is a song written by Joe Burhkin and Johnny DeVries. It was performed by Louis Jordan and his Tympany Five and released on the Decca label (catalog no. 24104-A).

The song's lyrics describe an attractive waitress who conveys orders to the kitchen for various orders, including a "boogie woogie blue plate". 

The song peaked at No. 1 on Billboards race record chart and remained on the chart for 24 weeks. It also reached No. 21 on the pop chart. It was ranked No. 2 on the magazine's list of the most played race records of 1947.

See also
 Billboard Most-Played Race Records of 1947

References

1947 songs
Louis Jordan songs